Vaal–Orange, also known as Seroa, is an extinct ǃKwi language of South Africa and Lesotho.  It comprised the ǂUngkue dialect (also rendered ǂKunkwe) of the Warrenton area, recorded by Carl Meinhof, and the ǁŨǁʼe dialect (also rendered ǁKu-ǁʼe or ǁKuǁe), spoken near Theunissen and Bethany in South Africa and into Lesotho, recorded by Dorothea Bleek.

The name "Vaal–Orange" comes from the Vaal and Orange Rivers, which converge where ǂUngkue dialect was spoken.  Seroa is the Sesotho name, literally "language of the Baroa (Bushmen)".

Like ǀXam, ǂUngkue used 'inclusory' pronouns for compound subjects:

References

Sources
[http://email.eva.mpg.de/~gueldema/pdf/CapeArea.pdf Structural isoglosses between Khoekhoe and Tuu: the Cape as a linguistic area] by Tom Güldemann

Extinct languages of Africa
Tuu languages
Languages of South Africa
Languages of Lesotho

hr:ǁXegwi jezik
it:Lingua ǁxegwi